André Bernier (October 29, 1930  May 29, 2012) was a Canadian politician and accountant. He was elected to the House of Commons of Canada in the 1962 election to represent the Social Credit Party in the riding of Richmond—Wolfe. He was defeated in the 1963 election.

References

1930 births
Members of the House of Commons of Canada from Quebec
Social Credit Party of Canada MPs
2012 deaths
People from Windsor, Quebec
French Quebecers